John G. Gary (born December 23, 1943) is an American politician and a Republican who served as County Executive of Anne Arundel County, Maryland, from 1994-1998.

Prior to serving as County Executive, Gary was a member of the Maryland House of Delegates from 1983-1994.

Gary was defeated for re-election in 1998 by Janet Owens.

After his term ended, Gary has worked as a consultant. Gary was appointed to the Maryland Port Commission and currently is assisting former Congressman Helen Bentley on a search committee for Maryland's new Port Director.

Education
Delegate Gary graduated from Glen Burnie High School. He attended Anne Arundel Community College and the University of Maryland.

Career
Delegate Gary earned several awards during his career including Man of the Year from the Young Republicans of Anne Arundel County in 1977 and Legislator of the Year by the American Family Association in 1989. He served as Assistant Minority Whip and was a member of the Constitutional and Administrative Law Committee from 1983 until 1986 and the Appropriations Committee from 1987 until 1994.

Election results
1998 Race for Anne Arundel County Executive
{| class="wikitable"
|-
!Name
!Votes
!Percent
!Outcome
|-
|-
|Janet S. Owens, Dem.
|87,676
|  57.8%
|   Won
|-
|-
|John G. Gary, Rep.
|63,879
|  42.1%
|   Lost
|-
|Other Write-Ins
|226
|  0.1%
|   Lost
|-
|}

1990 Race for Maryland House of Delegates – District 33A
{| class="wikitable"
|-
!Name
!Votes
!Percent
!Outcome
|-
|-
|Elizabeth S. Smith, Rep.
|15,861
|  20%
|   Won
|-
|-
|John G. Gary, Rep.
|15,607
|  20%
|   Won
|-
|-
|Marsha G. Perry, Dem.
|15,123
|  19%
|   Won
|-
|-
|Bill Burlison, Rep.
|10,128
|  17%
|   Lost
|-
|-
|Edwin E. Edel, Dem.
|15,123
|  13%
|   Lost
|-
|-
|Sabine N. Bosma, Dem.
|7,733
|  10%
|   Lost
|}

1986 Race for Maryland House of Delegates – District 33A
{| class="wikitable"
|-
!Name
!Votes
!Percent
!Outcome
|-
|-
|Elizabeth S. Smith, Rep.
|13,091
|  20%
|   Won
|-
|-
|John G. Gary, Rep.
|12,315
|  19%
|   Won
|-
|-
|Marsha G. Perry, Dem.
|10,476
|  16%
|   Won
|-
|-
|John Witty, Rep.
|10,272
|  16%
|   Lost
|-
|-
|Bill Burlison, Dem.
|9,092
|  14%
|   Lost
|-
|-
|Douglas W. Diehl, Dem.
|8,985
|  14%
|   Lost
|}

References

External links
 Gary Biography from the Maryland Archives

Republican Party members of the Maryland House of Delegates
1943 births
Living people
Anne Arundel County Executives